The Men's 109 kg weightlifting competitions at the 2020 Summer Olympics in Tokyo took place on 3 August, at the Tokyo International Forum.

Records

Results

References

Weightlifting at the 2020 Summer Olympics
Men's events at the 2020 Summer Olympics